Samuela Vuluma Vula (born 22 August 1984) is a Fijian former footballer who played as a defender. He played for Fijian clubs including Rewa, Lautoka, Suva and Labasa. He also won seven caps for the Fiji national team.

Club career
In 2009, Vula represented Lautoka F.C., while also serving as a military officer. 

In 2012, Vula earned several awards in a successful season playing for Suva. He was the player of the tournament in both the Fiji FACT and Courts IDC competitions. Following these awards, he was voted men's player of the year by the Fiji Football Association. In October of that year, Vula stated he intended to remain with Suva for the remainder of his career.

In 2013, Vula was banned and fined $5,000 for indiscipline during the 2013 edition of the Fiji FACT. He was accused of having verbally abused his own club's management team, as well as damaging property at the team base camp. 

Vula signed for Labasa in 2014 for a fee of around $2,000.

After a period away on peacekeeping duties with the military, he was back playing for Suva in 2016.

References

External links

1984 births
Living people
I-Taukei Fijian people
Fijian footballers
Association football defenders
Fiji international footballers
2012 OFC Nations Cup players
2008 OFC Nations Cup players
Rewa F.C. players
Suva F.C. players